Edouardo Jordan is an American chef and restaurateur based in Seattle, Washington.

Early life and career
Jordan grew up in St. Petersburg, Florida and studied business at the University of Florida. He then attended the Le Cordon Bleu (Orlando Culinary Academy) and got his first kitchen job in Tampa, Florida. Jordan received an apprenticeship at The French Laundry and then worked at The Herbfarm in Woodinville, Washington. He then went to New York City to work at Per Se (restaurant). He spent a month working with salumists in Parma, Italy before returning to New York to join the kitchen at Lincoln Ristorante. In 2012, he moved to Seattle to work at Matt Dillon's Sitka and Spruce. He soon became the Chef De Cuisine at Dillon's Bar Sajor.

Salare and JuneBaby
In 2015, Jordan opened his own restaurant, Salare in Ravenna, Seattle, with some help from a Kickstarter campaign. Salare's menu is based in Jordan's French and Italian training with some Southern influences. He was named a StarChefs Rising Star and won Eater Seattle's 2015 “Chef of the Year” title. He was named one of the Best New Chefs of 2016 by Food & Wine magazine.

In 2017, Jordan opened his second restaurant, JuneBaby, featuring Southern food and located just down the street from Salare, and it received national attention. It was selected as a Critic's Pick by Pete Wells of the New York Times. JuneBaby was named to Esquire magazine's 2017 list of Best New Restaurants in America. It was named one of Food & Wine'''s ten best restaurants in 2018.

At the 2018 James Beard Foundation Awards, Jordan won the title of Best Chef: Northwest, and JuneBaby won Best New Restaurant. The Puget Sound Business Journal named Jordan to its 2018 list of 40 Under 40. Seattle Magazine named him one of Seattle's Most Influential People. People magazine named Jordan as a finalist for sexiest chef alive.

On June 8 2021, Eater reported that Jordan had announced the permanent closing of Salare.

Sexual harassment allegations
Jordan was accused of repeatedly groping four of his restaurant employees at work, according to a June 13, 2021 article in the Seattle Times''. An additional ten workers said that he "made sexual comments, including about their breasts, or frequently touched them in unwanted ways, like hugging them from behind at work." On the day the article was published, nearly all of Jordan's restaurant staff at his Salare and JuneBaby restaurants quit their jobs.
As of January 2022, no criminal charges were filed nor were any civil actions brought against Jordan as a result of these multiple accusations.

External links
 Salare restaurant
 JuneBaby restaurant

References 

Living people
1980 births
People from St. Petersburg, Florida
American chefs
Chefs from Seattle
James Beard Foundation Award winners